Kasara is a census town in Thane district in the Indian state of Maharashtra. The town is on the busy Mumbai–Nashik route, which is one of the four major routes that lead into Mumbai. Kasara is served by a railway station on the Mumbai Suburban Railway, and is the final stop in the north-east sector of the Central Line and important railway station. That  is for abbreviation for Kasara Local is set as "N" means North side Local's Last Station. Town is also known for the winding Kasara ghat pass.

Demographics
 India census, Kasara had a population of 15,611. Males constitute 51% of the population and females 49%. Kasara has an average literacy rate of 63%, lower than the national average of 76.5%: male literacy is 73%, and female literacy is 52%. In Kasara, 15% of the population is under 6 years of age.

References

Cities and towns in Thane district